Integral monotopic proteins are permanently attached to the cell membrane from one side, and are a type of integral membrane protein (IMP).

Three-dimensional structures of the following integral monotopic proteins have been determined:
prostaglandin H2 syntheses 1 and 2 (cyclooxygenases)
lanosterol synthase and squalene-hopene cyclase
microsomal prostaglandin E synthase
carnitine O-palmitoyltransferase 2
Phosphoglycosyl transferase C 

There are also structures of integral monotopic domains of transmembrane proteins:
monoamine oxidases A and B
fatty acid amide hydrolase
mammalian cytochrome P450 oxidases
corticosteroid 11-beta-dehydrogenases

References

Integral membrane proteins